Gaspard Deridder (4 March 1918 – 1977) was a Belgian boxer who competed in the 1936 Summer Olympics.

In 1936 he was eliminated in the second round of the welterweight class after losing his fight to Hens Dekkers.

External links
 
 

1918 births
1977 deaths
Welterweight boxers
Olympic boxers of Belgium
Boxers at the 1936 Summer Olympics
Belgian male boxers